Beauties of the Night (in Spanish Bellas de noche) is a 2016 Mexican documentary film. It is the first production of the filmmaker María José Cuevas. The film shows a glimpse of the glory, sunset and resurgence of five of the main showgirls (vedettes) that triumphed in Mexico in the decades of the 1970s and 1980s.

Synopsis
They were the Queens of the Night in Mexico in the 1970's and 1980's. The names of the great vedettes illuminated the streets of Mexico City from the canopies of the big nightclubs, cabarets and theaters. But time passed. Nightlife changed in Mexico. New types of entertainment replaced them and the vedettes seemed to have been forgotten.

Today, more than forty years of its splendor in the country's nightlife, Beauties of the Night explores the lives of five of the top vedettes of the golden years: Olga Breeskin, Lyn May, Rossy Mendoza, Wanda Seux and Princesa Yamal. The film shows the viewer a deeper facet of the current life of these five vedettes. Women who, despite the years and have taken their lives to the extreme, are full of life and with an enviable physical condition. Not only have they managed to reinvent themselves and survive in the show business, but also in life itself. Between laughter and tears, the film reflects the passage of years, emotions and personal challenges for the life of each of these women.

Cast
 Olga Breeskin
 Lyn May
 Rossy Mendoza
 Wanda Seux
 Princesa Yamal

Production
The title of the documentary evokes the film Bellas de noche, the first film of the so-called Cine de ficheras, which dates back to 1975.

The idea of Cuevas to pay homage to these women arises from her childhood. Cuevas, daughter of the prestigious Mexican artist José Luis Cuevas, had contact with several of these women, who were friends of her father. Years later, Cuevas had a meeting with Princesa Yamal, who performed an Arab dance in front of her, giving her the idea of producing this documentary, whose realization lasted for a decade. The film delivers an exercise in which the contrasts of time come to light and unveils what lies behind the stardom. You can appreciate an honest, dynamic and effective exercise in which remains the curiosity to know more details. Although the documentary came from the idea of paying homage to these women, the relationship between them and the filmmaker María José Cuevas, became so close that they became a family. The vedettes Thelma Tixou, Sasha Montenegro and Princesa Lea were also considered to participate in the documentary, refusing for various reasons. The last two appear in the final credits in the acknowledgments section. The film is also favored by an enriching archive material.

Awards

Morelia International Film Festival

 Best Mexican Documentary
 Best Mexican Documentary realized by a woman
 Best Mexican Feature film

Los Cabos International Film Festival
 Audience Award for a Mexican Documentary film

Mexico City Awards
 Best Film

Panama International Film Festival
 Best Documentary film

Ariel Award

 Best Film (Nominated)
 Best Mexican Documentary Film (Nominated)
 Best Edition (Nominated)
 Best First Production (Nominated)

Other
 International Documentary Film Festival Amsterdam - Official Selection.
 Toronto Film Festival - Official Selection
 Telluride Film Festival - Official Selection
 Cartagena of Indias International Film Festival - Official Selection
 Palm Springs International Film Festival - Official selection
 Buenos Aires International Festival of Independent Cinema - Official Selection
 Film Society of Lincoln Center - Special Projection
 Festival Cinema du Monde (Sherbrooke, Nova Scotia) - Official Selection
 Mexico Now Festival New York -  Official Selection

References

External links
 
 Official Facebook
 Official Twitter
 Beauties of the Night in Ambulante.com
 Official Trailer
 Beauties of the Night Review in the Toronto Film Festival
 Beauties of the Night in International Documentary Film Festival Amsterdam

Vedettes (cabaret)
2016 films
2016 documentary films
Mexican documentary films
2010s Spanish-language films
2010s Mexican films